Pedro Juan Rosaly Capó (21 April 1862 – 8 March 1912) was Mayor of Ponce, Puerto Rico from 23 December 1900 until 28 February 1901.

Political career
After the elections of 6 November 1900, Rosaly was elected to the Puerto Rico House of Representatives as a representative by the District of Ponce. He joined three other representatives from Ponce and all from the Republican Party: Francisco Parra Capó, Pedro Juan Besosa, Ulpiano R. Colom.

Hacendado and homeowner

Pedro Juan Rosaly is best remembered for having a magnificent residence (the Rosaly-Batiz House) built at the corner of Villa and Mendez Vigo streets by renowned architect Manuel V. Domenech and who, four years later, in 1904, himself became mayor of Ponce.

Banker and businessman 
Rosaly became the president of Banco de Ponce in the 1940s and established the first branch outside Puerto Rico, in New York City.  In 1901, Rosaly became the first person to be granted a franchise to develop local and long distance telephone service in Puerto Rico. The business plan, however, did not proceed as it was not approved by the president of the United States.

Death and legacy
Rosaly died in Ponce on 8 March 1912, and was buried at Cementerio Católico San Vicente de Paul. In Ponce there is a public housing development named after him.

References

Notes

See also

 List of Puerto Ricans
 List of mayors of Ponce, Puerto Rico

1862 births
1912 deaths
Burials at Cementerio Católico San Vicente de Paul
Businesspeople from Ponce
Mayors of Ponce, Puerto Rico
People from Guayanilla, Puerto Rico
Puerto Rican businesspeople
19th-century American businesspeople